DMX: Don't Try to Understand is a 2021 American documentary film directed by Christopher Frierson and Clark Slater. The film follows a year in the life of American rapper DMX. It was released on HBO Max on November 25, 2021.

Summary
The film is focused on a year in the life of DMX, following him after his release from prison (after serving a year for tax evasion) in January 2019 as he attempts to rebuild his music career and reconnect with family. It also tracks his career, from his rough upbringing in Yonkers, New York, to his successful debut in the late 1990s. The rapper died on April 9, 2021.

Cast
 Earl "DMX" Simmons
 Desiree Lindstrom
 Tashera Simmons
 Xavier Simmons
 Exodus Simmons

Release
In December 2020, the film was picked up by HBO/Ringer Films and added to the Music Box series, executive produced by Bill Simmons. It had its world premiere at Doc NYC on November 23, 2021, and on HBO on November 25, 2021.

Reception
Julian Kimble of GQ called the film "a difficult watch," concluding that "DMX died trying to do right, but unable to escape demons that followed him for decades." Johnny Loftus of Decider wrote, "With its equal notes of resilience, chronic self-destruction, outsized talent, and a troubled personal life, DMX: Don't Try to Understand offers a compelling portrait of a rapper gone too soon."

References

External links 
 

2021 films
2021 documentary films
American documentary films
Documentary films about hip hop music and musicians
DMX (rapper)
HBO documentary films
2020s English-language films
2020s American films